Moshe Castel (1909 – December 12, 1991) was an Israeli painter.

Biography

Moshe Elazar Castel born in Jerusalem, Ottoman Palestine, in 1909, to Rabbi Yehuda Castel and his wife Rachel. The family was descended from Spanish Jews from Castile who immigrated to the Holy Land after the expulsion of the Jews from Spain in 1492. His father was born in Hebron. He opened religious schools for Sephardi boys in the Nahalat Shiv'a and Bukharim quarters of Jerusalem. Moshe grew up in the Bukharim neighborhood, where he attended his father's school. At the age of 13, he was accepted to the Bezalel Art School, directed by Boris Schatz, where he studied from 1921 to 1925. His teacher, Shmuel Ben David, encouraged him to study art in Paris. 
 
Castel traveled to Paris in 1927, where he attended Académie Julian and Ecole du Louvre. He sat in the Louvre copying the works of Rembrandt, Velasquez, Delacroix and Courbet, intrigued by their paint-layering techniques. It was here that he began to realize that "art is not symbolic, but rather material, the material is the main thing, the way the paint is placed, the way the layers are placed on the picture, this is the most essential thing."

In May 1927, the World Union of Hebrew Youth in Paris sponsored his first exhibit. Ze'ev Jabotinsky, who was in Paris at the time, wrote an introduction for the catalogue.

In 1940, Castel returned to Palestine and settled in Safed (Beit Castel). In   	
1949, Castel married Bilhah (née Bauman), an actress.

Artistic career

In 1947, Castel helped to found the  "New Horizons" (Ofakim Hadashim) group together with Yosef Zaritsky, Yehezkel Streichman, Marcel Janco and others. In 1959, he purchased a studio in Montparnasse where he worked for several months a year. In 1955, a solo exhibition of his works was mounted at the Tel Aviv Museum of Art. His murals hang in the Knesset, Binyanei HaUma Convention Center, Rockefeller Center in New York, and the official residence of the President of Israel in Jerusalem.

Style
In the 1930s and 1940s, many of Castel's paintings depicted the lives of Sephardic Jews in the Holy Land, revealing the influence of Persian miniatures. From the 1950s on, Castel created relief paintings inspired by the "ancient predecessors of Hebrew civilization." In 1948, he visited the ruins of an ancient synagogue in Korazin, an ancient Jewish town in the Galilee. Inspired by the basalt blocks he saw there, engraved with images and ornaments, he began to use ground basalt, which he molded into shapes, as his basic material. The technique utilized ground basalt rock mixed with sand and glue, infused with the rich colors that became his trademark. The works were embellished with archaic forms derived from ancient script, symbolism and mythological signs from Hebrew and Sumerian culture. As a member of the New Horizons group, he combined elements of abstract European art with Eastern motifs and "Canaanite art."

Awards and commemoration

In 1941 and again in 1946, Castel was awarded the Dizengoff Prize for painting by the Tel Aviv Municipality.
He won the  "Premier do Estado" prize at the São Paulo Art Biennial in Brazil.
The Moshe Castel Museum of Art, in a building designed by Israeli architect David Resnik overlooking the desert landscape, opened in Ma'aleh Adumim in 2010.

See also
Visual arts in Israel
Yitzhak Frenkel Frenel
Shimshon Holzman
Safed

References

External links

Castel Museum of Art website

1909 births
1991 deaths
People from Jerusalem
Sephardi Jews in Ottoman Palestine
Sephardi Jews in Mandatory Palestine
Israeli Sephardi Jews
20th-century Sephardi Jews
Bezalel Academy of Arts and Design alumni
20th-century Israeli painters